Crobylophora xanthochyta is a moth in the  family Lyonetiidae that is endemic to South Africa.

References

Lyonetiidae
Moths described in 1918
Endemic moths of South Africa